Moussa Ballo may refer to:

Moussa Ballo (footballer, born 1994), Ivorian football defender
Moussa Ballo (footballer, born 1996), Malian football left-back